Pekka Santanen (born 11 May 1958) is a Finnish modern pentathlete. He competed at the 1980 Summer Olympics.

References

1958 births
Living people
Finnish male modern pentathletes
Olympic modern pentathletes of Finland
Modern pentathletes at the 1980 Summer Olympics
Sportspeople from Helsinki